The list of shipwrecks in 2022 includes ships sunk, foundered, grounded, or otherwise lost during 2022.

January

1 January

3 January

4 January

5 January

6 January

8 January

9 January

10 January

11 January

12 January

15 January

17 January

18 January

19 January

22 January

25 January

27 January

28 January

30 January

31 January

Unknown date

February

1 February

2 February

3 February

4 February

7 February

8 February

12 February

14 February

15 February

16 February

18 February

19 February

21 February

23 February

24 February

25 February

26 February

27 February

Unknown date

March

1 March

2 March

3 March

6 March

11 March

13 March

17 March

20 March

22 March

24 March

27 March

April

3 April

4 April

7 April

9 April

10 April

13 April

14 April

15 April

19 April

20 April

21 April

23 April

24 April

26 April

28 April

Unknown date

May

2 May

3 May

7 May

9 May

11 May

12 May

14 May

15 May

16 May

18 May

23 May

27 May

28 May

31 May

June

7 June

8 June

8 June

10 June

12 June

14 June

17 June

18 June

20 June

22 June

23 June

26 June

29 June

July

1 July

2 July

5 July

6 July

7 July

11 July

12 July

22 July

23 July

25 July

31 July

Unknown date

August

3 August

7 August

10 August

11 August

13 August

17 August

20 August

22 August

23 August

24 August

26 August

29 August

September

2 September

7 September

8 September

9 September

24 September

27 September

Unknown date

October

2 October

7 October

11 October

13 October

15 October

19 October

28 October

31 October

Unknown date

November

3 November

12 November

16 November

26 November

30 November

December

1 December

5 December

8 December

9 December

12 December

18 December

21 December

23 December

24 December

29 December

31 December

Unknown date

References

Shipwrecks
2022